Eagle City may refer to the following places in the United States:

 Eagle City, Ohio, an unincorporated community
 Eagle City, Oklahoma, a community in Blaine County
 Eagle City, Utah, a ghost town in Garfield County
 Eagle City, North Carolina, a former city in Eagle Mills Township, Iredell County